Kibramoa is a genus of North American plectreurid spiders that was first described by Ralph Vary Chamberlin in 1924.

Species
 it contains seven species and one subspecies, found only in Mexico and the United States:
Kibramoa guapa Gertsch, 1958 – USA, Mexico
Kibramoa hermani Chamberlin & Ivie, 1935 – USA
Kibramoa isolata Gertsch, 1958 – Mexico
Kibramoa madrona Gertsch, 1958 – USA
Kibramoa paiuta Gertsch, 1958 – USA
Kibramoa suprenans (Chamberlin, 1919) (type) – USA
Kibramoa s. pima Gertsch, 1958 – USA
Kibramoa yuma Gertsch, 1958 – USA

See also
 List of Plectreuridae species

References

Araneomorphae genera
Fauna of California
Fauna of the California chaparral and woodlands
Plectreuridae
Spiders of Mexico
Spiders of the United States